Edward Green is a fictional character on the NBC crime drama Law & Order,  portrayed by Jesse L. Martin. He appeared in 202 episodes (198 episodes of Law & Order, two episodes of Law & Order: Special Victims Unit, one episode of Law & Order: Criminal Intent, and one episode  of Law & Order: Trial by Jury).

Character overview
Ed Green is introduced as senior detective Lennie Briscoe's (Jerry Orbach) new junior partner, succeeding Rey Curtis (Benjamin Bratt). Green's willingness to bend legal rules to arrest a suspect does little to endear him to his superiors, and he initially thinks Briscoe is too old to investigate crimes effectively. Green and Briscoe have several heated disagreements about the latter's capabilities. Later, however, Green grows to trust and respect his partner, as well as tone down his unorthodox investigative methods. He and Briscoe often joke about their age difference, as well as Green's Rolex watches and Briscoe’s  two failed marriages. His badge number is 3472.

After they work together on the show for five years, Briscoe retires, and Green is more affected by his retirement than he expected. It takes him a while to warm up to his next partner, Joe Fontana (Dennis Farina), whose style is more abrasive than Briscoe's.  However, Green eventually deflates some of the tension between Fontana and their lieutenant, Anita Van Buren (S. Epatha Merkerson).

Near the end of Season 15, Green is shot in the line of duty and hospitalized for several weeks. During his absence, his position is filled in by Nick Falco (Michael Imperioli). The absence of Green’s character from the show was occasioned in the real world by actor Martin's sabbatical to reprise his former Broadway depiction of Tom Collins in the motion picture version of Rent.

Green is promoted to senior detective after Fontana retires. He is partnered with Nina Cassady (Milena Govich), over the objections of Van Buren, who thinks Cassady is too inexperienced to be a homicide detective. Initially, Green seems to have a similar opinion, but as time passes, their partnership becomes more solid and they become more relaxed and friendly with one another. Their relationship remains professional, however.

After Cassady's departure, Green is next partnered with Cyrus Lupo (Jeremy Sisto). Green's reaction to Lupo is somewhat reserved at first, especially since the first case they work together is the suicide of Lupo's brother. Green is opposed to Lupo's working the case at all, but Van Buren overrules him. However, after a short period of time, Green seems to become more comfortable with Lupo as he does with his other partners. Around mid-season, Green even takes to affectionately dubbing Lupo as "Loops".

Near the end of Season 18, Green is involved in a shooting that leads to his being indicted and tried, though all charges are subsequently dropped. Even though Van Buren assures him that he is welcome back on the force, Green, unhappy with having "broken every rule in the book", decides to leave the squad. Lupo is given Green's position of senior partner, and Detective Kevin Bernard (Anthony Anderson) of the Internal Affairs Bureau, who investigated Green, becomes Lupo's new partner.

Personality
Green represents the L&O franchise's return to the wild, "Dirty Harry" type of character once popularized by Mike Logan (Chris Noth). Among the few personal touches made to the character are his affinity for gambling; he makes trips to Atlantic City often enough that Briscoe teases him about it. Subsequent episodes reveal that Green had stopped gambling but then fell back into it briefly after Briscoe's retirement and death.

Green has occasionally mentioned that his family traveled around the world due to his father's work as an oil engineer, and that he had lived in the Middle East at some point, as well as Abidjan in Côte d'Ivoire. He has also mentioned that he grew up in a religious family and revealed that his father has Alzheimer's disease. He has at least some family living in New York; in the episode "Deadlock", Van Buren recommends that Green’s family be protected from an escaped convict, and he responds, "Way ahead of you. They're already upstate."

Green is often a source of varied information in investigations. He speaks Spanish, some Russian—"Enough to pick up a date",—and a little French, and is up to date on popular culture; he appears to have a strong classical education.

He is a vegetarian, for which Briscoe often mocks him.

He was a uniformed police officer in 1994. He was working in the Narcotics Department in Midtown Manhattan by 1997.

Character highlights
Racial issues have been connected to Green's character in some episodes. For example, when Briscoe and Green investigate the shooting of a cop, they trace it to Stevie Thomas, a black boy whose brother Eric's murder was dismissed and effectively covered up by the police because he was black. Green interrogates Stevie solo at one point, speaking to him both as a cop and as a black man. He is called to testify in court, and at the end of the episode is seen reminding Van Buren that, while Eric Thomas' death creates guilt for those responsible, Eric is still dead.

Another instance of racial issues connected to Green is the episode "Prejudice", wherein a racist kills a black man over a taxi. When Briscoe and Green search the suspect's apartment, Green attempts to arrest him. However, the suspect throws him off and says he will comply only for Briscoe ("Not for you; for him!"); Green nonetheless forcefully handcuffs the man.

Like most other detective characters who join the series after 1993, Green carries a Glock 19 pistol as his service weapon.

Van Buren reprimands Green for getting personal while interviewing a suspect in the case of an abortion of a fetus thought to have Down syndrome. After Van Buren leaves, Green reveals to Lupo that he was once engaged to a woman who became pregnant; they ordered an amniotic test and "couldn't decide what to do". They eventually terminated the pregnancy.

Awards and decorations
The following are the medals and service awards worn by Ed, as seen in "Gunplay" (season 15, episode 5).

Appearances on other TV shows
Law & Order: Special Victims Unit
Season One
Episode 3: "Or Just Look Like One"
Episode 15: "Entitled"
Law & Order: Criminal Intent
Season One
Episode 7: "Poison"
Law & Order: Trial by Jury
Episode 8: "Skeleton"
Andy Barker, P.I.
Episode 5: "The Big No Sleep"

Credits

References

Law & Order characters
Fictional New York City Police Department detectives
Fictional African-American people
Fictional gamblers
Television characters introduced in 1999
Crossover characters in television
American male characters in television

pt:Ed Green